A March to Madness: A View from the Floor in the Atlantic Coast Conference is a book written by John Feinstein. It was written about the 1996–97 Atlantic Coast Conference basketball season, chronicling each ACC school's team's season, from the first practice, to the Big Dance. It includes, among other things, Dean Smith's final season at the University of North Carolina, and his team's Final Four run of that year.

References

1999 non-fiction books
Basketball books
1996–97 Atlantic Coast Conference men's basketball season
Back Bay Books books